Risopatrón Base, also Luis Risopatrón Base, is a small Chilean Antarctic research base in the northwest of Robert Island in the South Shetland Islands, Antarctica situated on the isthmus linking Coppermine Peninsula to Alfatar Peninsula and bounded by Carlota Cove to the north and Coppermine Cove to the south.  Established as a refuge in 1949 and opened as a base in 1954, the facility supports summer research in geology, geophysics and terrestrial biology.

The base is probably named after the Chilean geographer Luis Risopatrón (1869-1930) who compiled and published a comprehensive geographical dictionary of Chile in 1924.

Location

See also
 List of Antarctic research stations
 List of Antarctic field camps

References

 Management Plan for Antarctic Specially Protected Area No. 112: Coppermine Peninsula, Robert Island, South Shetland Islands. Secretariat of the Antarctic Treaty.
 ASPA 112: Coppermine Peninsula, Robert Island, South Shetland Islands. Secretariat of the Antarctic Treaty.
 J. Turner and S. Pendlebury. Greenwich, Robert and Media Luna Islands, South Shetland Islands. The International Antarctic Weather Forecasting Handbook. British Antarctic Survey.
 Bases, refugios y campamentos. INACH en Antártica.

Maps
 L.L. Ivanov. Antarctica: Livingston Island and Greenwich, Robert, Snow and Smith Islands. Scale 1:120000 topographic map. Troyan: Manfred Wörner Foundation, 2010.  (First edition 2009. )

Geography of Robert Island
Chilean Antarctic Territory
Outposts of the South Shetland Islands
1954 establishments in Antarctica